West End is a resort village in the Canadian province of Saskatchewan within Census Division No. 5. It is on the shores of Round Lake in the Rural Municipality of Fertile Belt No. 183.

History 
West End incorporated as a resort village on June 15, 1983.

Demographics 

Government 
The Resort Village of West End is governed by an elected municipal council and an appointed administrator. The mayor is Darcey Niemi and its administrator is Lorrayne Smith.

See also 
List of communities in Saskatchewan
List of municipalities in Saskatchewan
List of resort villages in Saskatchewan
List of villages in Saskatchewan
List of summer villages in Alberta

References 

Resort villages in Saskatchewan
Fertile Belt No. 183, Saskatchewan
Division No. 5, Saskatchewan